Lynn Kellogg (April 2, 1943 – November 12, 2020) was an American actress and singer.

Biography
Kellogg was perhaps best known for her role as Sheila in the original Broadway production of Hair in 1968. She also appeared in the 1969 film Charro! with Elvis Presley.

In Feb/1972 Kellogg traveled to Vietnam with Sammy Davis Jr and other performers where they performed a USO Show on several US bases in South Vietnam for the US military troops. 

She subsequently worked in children's television and was a performer of contemporary Christian music. She developed the educational series Animals, Animals, Animals, which aired from 1976 to 1981, and won both Emmy and Peabody Awards.

Death
Kellogg died from complications of COVID-19 at a  St. Louis hospital on November 12, 2020, during the COVID-19 pandemic in Missouri. She was 77. Her husband said she was infected after attending a gathering in Branson, Missouri, in which most attendants did not wear masks. At the time of her death, she also had a non-terminal form of leukemia, which had affected her vascular system.

Filmography
The Edge of Night 
The Beverly Hillbillies (1966) (Bird Watcher #6) (as Lynn Ketchum)
Charro! (1969) (Marcie)
It Takes a Thief (1968 TV series) (1970) (Gabriella)
Mission: Impossible (1966 TV series) (1970) (Roxy)

References

External links

 

1943 births
2020 deaths
20th-century American actresses
20th-century American women singers
21st-century American actresses
21st-century American women singers
Actresses from Wisconsin
American performers of Christian music
American musical theatre actresses
Deaths from the COVID-19 pandemic in Missouri
People from Appleton, Wisconsin
Singers from Wisconsin
University of Wisconsin–Madison alumni
20th-century American singers
21st-century American singers